The Latin Rhythm Albums chart is a music chart published in Billboard magazine. The data is compiled by Nielsen SoundScan from a sample that includes music stores, music departments at electronics and department stores, internet sales (both physical and digital) and verifiable sales from concert venues in the United States. The chart is composed of studio, live, and compilation releases by Latin artists performing in the Latin hip hop, urban, dance and reggaeton, the most popular Latin Rhythm music genres.

There were ten number-one albums in 2010. Puerto Rican duo Wisin & Yandel's seventh studio album, La Revolución (2009) bowed at the top of the chart for twenty-seven weeks in 2009, before leading the chart for the first fourteen weeks of 2010. The album debuted on the Billboard 200 chart at number seven, selling over 35,000 copies in its first week. It became the "highest debut for a Spanish language recording act since Mana's Amar Es Combatir debuted and peaked at number four in September 2006." This made "Maná and Wisin & Yandel the only artists who record exclusively in Spanish who have made it to the top ten of the Billboard 200." It later was awarded  the Billboard Latin Music Award for Latin Rhythm Album of the Year in 2010.
Puerto Rican duo Angel & Khriz's third studio album, Da' Take Over (2010) lead the chart for one week in April. The album became the group's first number one set on the Billboard Latin Rhythm Albums chart, debuting at number six and eighteen on the Billboard Latin Albums and Billboard Rap Albums charts, respectively. Puerto Rican performer Ivy Queen's seventh studio album, Drama Queen (2010) sold 3000 copies in its first week, dominating the chart for ten consecutive weeks from July until October. The set debuted at number 163 on the Billboard 200 chart, number eighteen on the Billboard Rap Albums chart, and number three on the Billboard Latin Albums chart. The album gave Queen her second number one on the Latin Rhythm Albums chart, remaining the only female artist to post a number one on that chart.

Albums

References

Rhythm 2010
United States Latin Rhythm Albums
2010 in Latin music